Jogither is a small village which comes in geo boundaries of Pratappur in Khatima Tehsil of Udham Singh Nagar district, Uttarakhand, India.Postal code is 262311, which is little different from Khatima as all the parcels and letter is handovered by Nanakmatta Post Branch.  

Villages in Udham Singh Nagar district